The 2018 Women's EuroHockey Indoor Championship II was the 12th edition of the tournament. It was held from 19 to 21 January 2018 in Brussels, Belgium.

Belgium won the tournament for the first time after topping the pool. Along with Belgium, Austria qualified to the 2020 EuroHockey Indoor Nations Championship as the two highest ranked teams.

Qualified Teams
The following teams, shown with pre-tournament world rankings, participated in the 2018 EuroHockey Indoor Championship II.

Results
All times are local (UTC+1).

Preliminary round

Pool A

Pool B

Classification round

Pool C

Pool D

Awards

Statistics

Final standings

Goalscorers

References

Women's EuroHockey Indoor Championship II
International women's indoor hockey competitions hosted by Belgium
EuroHockey Indoor Championship
EuroHockey Indoor Championship
Sports competitions in Brussels
EuroHockey Indoor Championship Women
2010s in Brussels
Women 2